is a Japanese actress, voice actress, and comedienne formerly employed by Vocal before transferring to remax. She is best known for voicing Momiji Sohma in Fruits Basket, Tomoka Rana Jude in Girls Bravo, Mitsukuni Haninozuka in Ouran High School Host Club and Ruby in the Jewelpet franchise.

She has great respect for her Ouran co-star Maaya Sakamoto, and calls the older lady "Onee-sama" (お姉さま, a very respectful way of saying "elder sister"). She announced that she left Vocal company on 31 December 2015.

On 1 August 2019, it was announced that she would leave Remax and join Aoni Production.

Filmography

Anime television 

 Boogiepop Phantom as Akane Kojima (Phantom)
 Brigadoon: Marin & Melan as Moe Kisaragi
 Eden of the East as Micchon (Mikuru Katsuhara)
 Fruits Basket as Momiji Sohma
 Futari wa Pretty Cure Splash Star as Minori Hyuga
 Future Card Buddyfight X as Chibi Panda
 Gakuen Babysitters as Takuma Mamizuka and Umi Mamizuka
 Genki Genki Nontan as Nontan
 Girls Bravo as Tomoka Rana Judo
 Honey and Clover as Hasegawa Megumi (ep 4)
 InuYasha as Mayu
 Jewelpet as Ruby
 Jubei-chan: The Secret of the Lovely Eyepatch as Otome Shirahatamaru
 Jubei-chan 2: The Counter Attack of Siberian Yagyu as Ayunosuke Odago
 Kamisama Kiss as Botanmaru
 Kochira Katsushika-ku Kameari Kōen-mae Hashutsujo as Lemon Giboshi
 Kodomo no Omocha as Mariko Sakai
 Lady Jewelpet as Ruby
 Jewelpet: Magical Change as Ruby
 Legendz: Tale of the Dragon Kings as Zuou (Bigfoot)
 Maho Girls PreCure! as Mofurun
 Minami-ke as Hitomi
 Mushishi as Watahiko (ep 21)
 Ojamajo Doremi as Sayaka
 Ouran High School Host Club as Mitsukuni Haninozuka (Honey)
 Pokémon as Marissa, Togekiss, Bellossom
 Queen's Blade as Ymir
 Soul Eater as Angela Leon
 Sugar Sugar Rune as Waffle
 You're Under Arrest as Megumi Honda
 Ojarumaru as Bin-chan
 One Piece as Lil, Chome

Anime films 

 Crayon Shin-chan: The Kasukabe Boys of the Evening Sun (movie 12) as Tsubaki
 Hutch the Honeybee as Hutch
 Zatch Bell! (movie 2) as 4th generation Vulcan
 Toire no Hanako-san (movie) as Hanako-san
 Jewelpet the Movie: Sweets Dance Princess as Ruby
 Pretty Cure All Stars: Singing with Everyone♪ Miraculous Magic! as Mofurun
 Maho Girls PreCure! the Movie: The Miraculous Transformation! Cure Mofurun! as Mofurun / Cure Mofurun
 Jewelpet Attack Travel! as Ruby

Video games 

 Ar tonelico Qoga: Knell of Ar Ciel as Teppo
 Ouran High School Host Club as Mitsukuni Haninozuka (Honey)
 Tokimeki Memorial Girl's Side as young Kei Hazuki
 PlayStation All Stars Battle Royale as Fat Princess
 Sakura Taisen 5 as Rikaritta Aries*
 Super Smash Bros. series as Bellossom
 Little Witch Academia: Chamber of Time as Molly McIntyre
 Arknights as Vermeil

Others 

 Azumanga Web Daioh (ONA) as Chiyo Mihama
 Blue Submarine No. 6 (OAV) as Mei Ling Huang
 Dai Mahou Touge (OAV) as Pyun
 Grrl Power (OAV) as Sora

References

External links 

 Official agency profile 
 

1988 births
Living people
Aoni Production voice actors
Japanese stage actresses
Japanese video game actresses
Japanese voice actresses
Japanese comedians
Comedians from Tokyo
Voice actresses from Tokyo
21st-century Japanese actresses